Aubach is a river of Bavaria, Germany. It is a left tributary of the Schwabach near Igensdorf.

See also
List of rivers of Bavaria

Rivers of Bavaria
Rivers of Germany